"Cutting off one's nose to spite one's face" is an expression used to describe a needlessly self-destructive overreaction to a problem: "Don't cut off your nose to spite your face" is a warning against acting out of pique, or against pursuing revenge in a way that would damage oneself more than the object of one's anger.

Origins
It was not uncommon in the Middle Ages for a person to cut off the nose of another for various reasons, including punishment from the state, or as an act of revenge. In particular, the English Saint Ebbe was said to have severed her own nose to dissuade violation by Viking raiders. Cognitive scientist Steven Pinker notes that the phrase may have originated from this practice, as at this time "cutting off someone's nose was the prototypical act of spite."

The expression has since become a blanket term for (often unwise) self-destructive actions motivated purely by anger or desire for revenge. For example, if a man was angered by his wife, he might burn down their house to punish her; however, burning down her house would also mean burning down his, along with all of their possessions.

In the 1796 edition of Francis Grose's Classical Dictionary of the Vulgar Tongue, "He cut off his nose to be revenged of his face" is said to apply to "one who, to be revenged on his neighbor, has materially injured himself."

See also
Rhinectomy, the removal of the nose
Appeal to spite
Inequity aversion

References

English-language idioms
Proverbs